KZ Manager is a name shared by many similar resource management computer video games that put the player in the role of a Nazi concentration camp commandant or "manager", where the "resources" to be managed include, depending on the version of the game, prisoners (either Jews, Turks or Gypsies), poison gas supplies, "normal" money and various equipment, as well as "public opinion" on the "productivity" of the camp. The game has been indexed by the German Federal Department for Media Harmful to Young Persons, meaning that it is forbidden to distribute the game in Germany.

Gameplay 
The goal of the game is to keep the camp functioning by keeping the "public opinion" or other important resources and gauges over or under a certain threshold. In one version, public opinion rises when the "manager" executes a number of prisoners with Zyklon B. However, ordering said gas costs money, which can be gathered by forcing the prisoners to work.

Spending too much time without a "sufficient" number of executions makes "public satisfaction" drop, and having too few working prisoners will soon drive to a resource shortage, and closing of the camp, thus losing the game. Also, prisoners must be "purchased" by the camp's "manager", and the corpses of the deceased prisoners must be disposed of (the game describes them as "Müllberg", German for "garbage mountain " or "pile of garbage"), an operation which also has an associated cost.

Like other resource management games, this means that ultimately the goal of the game is trying to find an optimal balance and timing between expenses, income, actions and "production goals", although with a highly controversial twist.

History 
In 1991, The New York Times reported that KZ Manager was one of about 140 games with similar themes. Austrian newspapers reported that a poll of students in one city found 39 percent knew of the games and 22 percent had encountered them. "KZ" is the German shorthand for concentration camp.

Versions 
Each game version was released several times and began to circulate in Austria and Germany during the 1990s, the earliest versions being DOS, text mode games, graphical DOS versions as well as a Windows version titled  KZ Manager Millennium. According to a 1991 article written by Linda Rohrbough, an Amiga version has been found to exist. Gameplay and graphics of the Amiga version and its 256 color DOS port were far more advanced than in the original C64 game.

References

External links 
 New York Times: Video Game Uncovered in Europe Uses Nazi Death Camps as Theme

1990 video games
The Holocaust in popular culture
Amiga games
Commodore 64 games
Construction and management simulation games
DOS games
Video games developed in Austria
Windows games